Edmond North High School is located in Edmond, Oklahoma. The school colors are silver, white and navy. The school's mascot is the Siberian Husky.

As of the 2012–2013 school year, the school had an enrollment of 2,437 students and 127 classroom teachers (on a FTE basis, for a student-teacher ratio of 27:1.

Edmond North history
Edmond North High School (previously Edmond North Mid-High serving ninth & tenth grades only) became a four-year high school on May 2, 1993 by adding, respectively, eleventh and then twelfth grades. The rapid growth of the community in the early and mid-1990s prompted the decision to increase the number of high schools in the district. This allowed for expansion of the school's main building as well as the size and variety of available classes.

The initial graduating class was formed in 1994 and would graduate as the 1st class in May 1995. 1994 was the first year they hosted summer school. Edmond Memorial had previously been host, and with a second high school available, a rotation began between the two high schools and would later include Edmond Santa Fe High School which formed in 1993. 

Community expansion continued through the '90s and into the 2000s, prompting Edmond North to further expand the main building. Additional portable classrooms were added, more parking became available, and a track, full size football field and tennis courts were also added.

Awards and recognition
During the 2007–08 school year, Edmond North School was recognized with the Blue Ribbon School Award of Excellence by the United States Department of Education, the highest award an American school can receive.

Sports programs 
Edmond North competes in class 6A athletically and is a part of the Central Oklahoma Athletics Conference.

Men
 Baseball 
 Basketball 
 Cross country
 Football
 Golf 
 Soccer
 Swimming 
 Tennis 
 Track and field 
 Wrestling

Women
 Basketball
 Cross country 
 Golf 
 Soccer 
 Softball 
 Swimming 
 Tennis 
 Track and field
 Volleyball 
 Pom 
 Cheer

Notable alumni
Kelly Gregg (1976-), nose tackle for the Baltimore Ravens.
Shannon Miller (1977- ), Olympic Gymnast. Silver and bronze medalist in 1992 Olympics and a gold medalist at the 1996 Olympics.
Bright Dike (1987-), Professional Soccer Player for the Portland Timbers
Mookie Salaam (1990–), American track athlete
Kevin Tway (1988-), winner of 2018 Safeway Open on the PGA Tour and the 2005 U.S. Junior Amateur Golf Championship.
Teyon Ware (1983-), American amateur wrestler. 
Robert Streb (1987-), winner of the 2014 and 2020 RSM Classic on the PGA Tour.
Courtney Dike (1995-), Nigerian female soccer player who became the first native Oklahoman to ever play in the World Cup during the 2015 FIFA Women's World Cup in Canada.
Daryl Dike (2000-),  a Nigerian-American soccer player who plays for West Bromwich Albion in Major League Soccer and the United States men's national soccer team, graduated from Edmond North in 2018.

References

External links 
Edmond North High School website
Edmond North Husky Band Program
Edmond North High School, National Center for Education Statistics
Edmond North Football website

Public high schools in Oklahoma
Schools in Oklahoma County, Oklahoma
Edmond, Oklahoma